In biology, the BBCH-scale for faba beans describes the phenological development of faba beans using the BBCH-scale.

The phenological growth stages and BBCH-identification keys of faba beans are:

1 Stem elongation may occur earlier than stage 19; in this case continue with the principal stage 3
2 First internode extends from the scale leaf node to the first true leaf node

References
 

 

BBCH-scale